Rev. Col. John Hancock Jr. (June 1, 1702 – May 7, 1744) was a colonial American clergyman, soldier, planter, politician, and father of politician John Hancock III. Hancock was born in Lexington, Massachusetts, He was the son of Col. John Hancock Sr. and Elizabeth Clark.

Biography
Hancock graduated from Harvard College in 1719 and served as a librarian there from 1723 to 1726. He was ordained on November 2, 1726, and settled in Quincy, Massachusetts, as pastor of United First Parish Church, Quincy, Massachusetts until his death. He also owned one household slave.

He died when his son John was seven years old, Soon after, John's mother sent him to live with his father's brother, Thomas Hancock. Hancock Cemetery in Quincy is named in his honor.

References

External links

1702 births
1744 deaths
American slave owners
Burials in Massachusetts
Harvard College alumni
Hancock family of Massachusetts
Harvard University librarians
Massachusetts colonial-era clergy
People from Lexington, Massachusetts